The GCL White Sox were a Gulf Coast League minor league baseball team that played from 1966 to 1977 and from 1980 to 1997. The club was affiliated with the Chicago White Sox.

They won two league championships, in 1970 and 1977 - both under manager Joe Jones.

References

Defunct Florida Complex League teams
Baseball teams established in 1966
White Sox
Baseball teams disestablished in 1997